Lee Chao-ching (born 29 June 1950) is a Taiwanese politician. He served as the 15th and 16th Magistrate of Nantou County from 20 December 2005 until 30 November 2012.

Nantou County Magistrate

Nantou County Magistrate election
Lee assumed the position of Magistrate of Nantou County after winning the 2005 Republic of China local election on 3 December 2005 under the Kuomintang and took office on 20 December 2005. He then again secured his second term of magistrate after winning the 2009 Republic of China local election on 5 December 2009 and assumed office on 20 December 2009.

2012 corruption charges
Lee was detained on 30 November 2012 due to corruption charges stemming from his handling of the post-Typhoon Morakot reconstruction project budget. US$10,320 was found in his office, which was alleged to be part of the bribes he had received. The ROC Ministry of Interior (MOI) immediately released Lee from his duties. He was replaced as Nantou Magistrate by his deputy, Chen Chih-ching. Lee was also suspended from the Kuomintang.

In early April 2013, Lee was released in bail. After the release, he filed the application to be reinstated as the Magistrate of Nantou County. However, the MOI, backed by the Premier, rejected Lee's application. In August 2015, Lee was handed a prison sentence of thirty years by the Nantou District Court. Upon appeal to the Taiwan High Court, Lee's sentence was reduced to 22 years imprisonment.

References

Magistrates of Nantou County
Living people
Taiwanese politicians convicted of corruption
Kuomintang politicians in Taiwan
1950 births
Mayors of places in Taiwan
People convicted of bribery